Khalid Zahedi (born 5 March 1998) is an Afghan cricketer. He made his first-class debut for Amo Region in the 2017–18 Ahmad Shah Abdali 4-day Tournament on 1 November 2017. He made his List A debut for Logar Province in the 2019 Afghanistan Provincial Challenge Cup tournament on 1 August 2019.

References

External links
 

1998 births
Living people
Afghan cricketers
Amo Sharks cricketers
Place of birth missing (living people)